Kumarganj railway station is a station on the Howrah–New Jalpaiguri line in West Bengal, India. The name Kumarganj is linked with কুমার (potter)  and গঞ্জ (market). It is situated in Northeast Frontier zone (NFR) in Katihar railway division of India.

References 

Railway stations in Malda district
Railway stations opened in 2004
Katihar railway division